Che Christian Aaron Clay Wilson (born 17 January 1979, in Ely) is an English retired professional footballer having played for Norwich City, Bristol Rovers and Southend United.

Career

Wilson, a right footed left back, started his career with Norwich City for whom he made 25 appearances, becoming a cult hero with fans. He joined Bristol Rovers in 2000, where he remained two seasons. While at Rovers, his oldest sister gained notoriety as the woman inside the suit of Bristol Rovers matchday mascot, Captain Gas. (He has one other younger sister also) In 2002, he joined Cambridge City, where he remained for less than a month before joining Southend United.

After a slow start getting into the squad, Wilson was a permanent place on the Southend team sheet, with some solid displays. He is not well known for his goal scoring, but during the 2005–06 season he put a goal past promotion rivals Brentford in a 4–1 win, and also netted in the 3–0 win against Colchester United at Layer Road. Wilson was at the club since the 2003–04 season, and played in both Football League Trophy finals and the play-off final, making over 100 appearances for the club.

He signed for Brentford in a one-month loan deal on 16 January 2007. He played four games for Brentford before returning to Southend at the end of his one-month loan period. He joined Rotherham United on loan in March 2008.

Wilson was released by Southend United at the end of the 2007–08 season. During that season, he suffered from a serious achilles tendon injury which required major surgery and numerous bouts of rehabilitation. After two years and two operations, he then experienced a major problem with the other Achilles tendon which, after medical advice, forced him to retire from professional football.

Since retiring from the professional game, Wilson studied for his coaching badges and holds the UEFA A licence and was head coach of Cambridge University for four seasons. He also coached at Ipswich Town academy under Roy Keane.
Alongside this, Wilson has also completed a BSc (Hons) degree in Sport Science at Anglia Ruskin University in Cambridge.

Due to some time off between studies, Wilson signed for New Zealand side Richmond Athletic for the 2011 Nelson Pine Industries First Division season and has since returned to England.

Wilson completed a master's degree at Loughborough University in Sports Biomechanics in August 2014. He is currently the Head Of Football at the University Of Bath. Alongside his current role, Che is studying a Doctorate in Sport Coaching at Cardiff Metropolitan University.

Honours

Promotions
2004–05: League Two Playoff Winner (promotion to League One) – Southend United
2005–06: League One Champion (promotion to The Championship) – Southend United

References

External links

Cambridge University profile
Career information at ex-canaries.co.uk

Living people
1979 births
English footballers
Norwich City F.C. players
Bristol Rovers F.C. players
Cambridge City F.C. players
Brentford F.C. players
Southend United F.C. players
Rotherham United F.C. players
Richmond Athletic F.C. players
People from Ely, Cambridgeshire
Association football defenders